Baker–Strickler House, also known as May's Place, is a historic home located at Gordonsville, Louisa County, Virginia. It was built about 1856, and is a two-story, three-bay frame I-house dwelling in the Greek Revival style. It features decorative corner pilasters, a peaked door and window lintels, and a two-layer exterior frieze on all four elevations.

It was listed on the National Register of Historic Places in 2009.

References

Houses on the National Register of Historic Places in Virginia
Greek Revival houses in Virginia
Houses completed in 1856
Houses in Louisa County, Virginia
National Register of Historic Places in Louisa County, Virginia
1856 establishments in Virginia